The Minot Micropolitan Statistical Area, as defined by the United States Census Bureau, is an area consisting of three counties in North Dakota, anchored by the city of Minot. As of the 2010 census, the area had a population of 69,540. In 2012, it was estimated that the population of the Minot Micropolitan Area was 73,146.

Counties
McHenry
Renville
Ward

Communities

Places with more than 30,000 inhabitants
Minot (Principal city)

Places with 1,000 to 10,000 inhabitants
Burlington
Kenmare
Minot Air Force Base (census-designated place)
Velva

Places with 100 to 1,000 inhabitants

Places with less than 100 inhabitants
Balfour
Bantry
Bergen
Donnybrook
Douglas
Grano
Kief
Loraine
Ryder
Tolley
Voltaire

Unincorporated places
Norwich

Demographics

As of the census of 2000, there were 67,392 people, 26,652 households, and 17,815 families residing within the μSA. The racial makeup of the μSA was 93.17% White, 1.95% African American, 1.86% Native American, 0.74% Asian, 0.05% Pacific Islander, 0.64% from other races, and 1.58% from two or more races. Hispanic or Latino of any race were 1.73% of the population.

The median income for a household in the μSA was $30,563, and the median income for a family was $37,680. Males had a median income of $26,335 versus $18,345 for females. The per capita income for the μSA was $16,181.

See also
North Dakota census statistical areas

References